Janet Fallis is an Australian former professional tennis player of the 1970s.

Fallis won a girls' doubles title at the 1970 Australian Open partnering Janet Young, with whom she reached the women's doubles quarter-finals of the 1971 Australian Open. She made it to the singles third round in 1974, losing to the top-seeded Chris Evert. Her best result on the WTA Tour was a doubles runner-up finish at the 1974 NSW Open.

WTA Tour finals

Doubles (0–1)

References

External links
 
 

Year of birth missing (living people)
Living people
Australian female tennis players
Australian Open (tennis) junior champions
Grand Slam (tennis) champions in girls' doubles
20th-century Australian women